Guy de Montfort may refer to:

Guy de Montfort, Lord of Sidon (died 1228)
Guy de Montfort, Count of Bigorre (died 1220)
Guy de Montfort, Count of Nola (1244 – c. 1288)